J.P. Gregoriussen (Jóan Petur Gregoriussen, known as Jóan Petur upp í Trøð) (1 June 1845  – 15 November 1901)  was a  Faroese songwriter, poet and  writer. His poetry was well known in the Faroe Islands where his Wedding Ballad (Brúðarvísan) is often sung at weddings. As well as being a poet, Gregoriussen was a sailor and a carpenter.

Biography 
Gregoriussen was born in Kvívík, Faroe Islands. He grew up  with traditional Faroese poet  Joen Danielsen in Kvívík at a time when Lutheran minister V.U. Hammershaimb was the parish priest.
Gregoriussen worked as a fisherman near Iceland from 1867 to 1870. While in Iceland he went to church and heard services conducted in Icelandic. From that point he became more aware of the fact that in the Faroe Islands Danish, not Faroese, was the official language in church and school. Gregoriussen was a devoted member of "The Faroese Association" (Føringafelag) after it was established at the Christmas Meeting (Jólafundurin) in 1888.

Bibliography
 1928 - Yrkingar (Jóan Petur uppi í Trøð), Collected by M. A. Jacobsen, published by Varðin
 Nýársheilsa frá Føringatíðindi. Føringatíðindi, nr. 1, 1894
 Gentukæti. Føringatíðindi, nr. 2, 1894
 Vaagen. Føringatíðindi, nr. 4, 1894
 Rím um teir Lutherisku prestarnar... Føringatíðindi, nr. 10, 1894
 Við kaspiska havið. Føringatíðindi, nr. 11, 1894
 Tú forna kenda minnisstað. Føringatíðindi, nr. 13, 1894
 Hákun í Noregi. Føringatíðindi, nr. 4, 1895
 Til Fólkafundirnar í Føroyum. Føringatíðindi, nr. 12, 1895
 Sverras ríma. Føringatíðindi, nr. 1, 1896
 Um føroyingars framsýningferð til Bergen 1898. Fuglaframi, nr. 22, 1899
 Seg skjóta undir danskheit inn. Føringatíðindi, nr. 13, 1900
 Nakað lítið um Transvaalbardagan 1899-1900. Fuglaframi, nr. 13, 1900
 Í Føroyum. Fuglaframi, nr. 15, 1900
 So møtast vit her. Fuglaframi, nr. 17, 1900
 Kalendarørindi. Fuglaframi, nr. 9, 1901
 Brúðarvísan. Dagdvøljan, 1901
 Tróndur og Sigmundur á Havnartingi. Varðin, 2. bd.,  1922

References

1845 births
1901 deaths
19th-century Faroese poets
Faroese songwriters
Faroese-language poets
People from Kvívík
Faroese male poets
19th-century male writers